36 (thirty-six) is the natural number following 35 and preceding 37.

In mathematics

36 is both the square of six and a triangular number, making it a square triangular number. It is the smallest square triangular number other than one, and it is also the only triangular number other than one whose square root is also a triangular number. It is also a Harshad number.

It is the smallest number n with exactly eight solutions to the equation . It is the smallest number with exactly nine divisors, leading 36 to be a highly composite number. Adding up some subsets of its divisors (e.g., 6, 12, and 18) gives 36; hence, it is a semiperfect number.

This number is the sum of the cubes of the first three positive integers and also the product of the squares of the first three positive integers.

36 is the number of degrees in the interior angle of each tip of a regular pentagram.

The thirty-six officers problem is a mathematical puzzle with no solution.

The number of possible outcomes (not summed) in the roll of two distinct dice.

36 is the largest numeric base that some computer systems support because it exhausts the numerals, 0–9, and the letters, A-Z. See Base 36.

The truncated cube and the truncated octahedron are Archimedean solids with 36 edges.

The number of domino tilings of a 4×4 checkerboard is 36.

Since it is possible to find sequences of 36 consecutive integers such that each inner member shares a factor with either the first or the last member, 36 is an Erdős–Woods number.

The sum of the integers from 1 to 36 is 666 (see number of the beast).

Measurements
 The number of inches in a yard (3 feet).
 In the UK, a standard beer barrel is 36 UK gallons, about 163.7 litres.

In science
The atomic number of krypton
Many early computers featured a 36-bit word length
36 is the number of characters required to store the display name of a UUID or GUID (e.g., 00000000-0000-0000-C000-000000000046).

In religion 
 Jewish tradition holds that the number 36 has had special significance since the beginning of time: According to the Midrash, the light created by God on the first day of creation shone for exactly 36 hours; it was replaced by the light of the Sun that was created on the Fourth Day. The Torah commands 36 times to love, respect and protect the stranger. Furthermore, in every generation there are 36 righteous people (the "Lamed Vav Tzadikim") in whose merit the world continues to exist. In the modern celebration of Hanukkah, 36 candles are kindled in the menorah over the eight days of that holiday (not including the shamash candle).
 In one Māori legend, concerning the creation of mankind by the god Tāne, 36 gods took active part in assembling the various parts of the first human before Tāne breathed life into her.
 In Shaivism (s.a. Kaśmir Śaivism), The 36 tattvas describe the Absolute, its internal aspects and the creation including living beings, down to the physical reality.
 In Egyptian religion, the 36 decans are a series of gods presiding over the degrees of the zodiac and the fixed stars.

In the arts, culture, and philosophy 
 36 Views of Mount Fuji, a famous series of prints by Japanese ukiyo-e artist Katsushika Hokusai
 The 36th Chamber of Shaolin is a 1978 kung fu film
 The Thirty-Six Dramatic Situations are considered a useful conceptual aid in theater.
 Thirty-Six Stratagems are a collection of Chinese proverbs illustrating useful approaches to conflict situations.
 In French-speaking countries, 36 is often used as a placeholder number.
 36 Crazyfists are a four-piece metal band from Alaska.
 36? (Thirty-Six) is a Canadian Psychedelic rock band (On Newgrounds)
 36 is the alias of ambient/experimental musician Dennis Huddleston from the UK.
 Enter The Wu-Tang (36 Chambers) is an album by Wu-Tang Clan
 The 36 Lessons of Vivec is the title of a book series in the video game The Elder Scrolls III: Morrowind.
 The game of roulette has 36 numbers on the number layout and roulette wheel (together with a 0 or 00 depending on whether it is a European wheel 37 or American wheel 38)
 The roulette based game Rollorpoker uses 36 playing cards on the wheel and playing grid, instead of numbers.
 "36" is a song by System of a Down
"36 Degrees" is a song by the band Placebo

In sports 
 Most runs one can hit off a (non-penalised) over in cricket. See six sixes in an over. 
The amount of races in a NASCAR Cup Series season.
 Australian basketball team the Adelaide 36ers is named after the year in which South Australia was founded.
 The number of consecutive bowling strikes in a 900 series (3 consecutive perfect games)
 The number of vehicles that run in each race of NASCAR's Camping World Truck Series.
 India's lowest ever test innings score in cricket, versus Australia at the Adelaide Oval on 18 December 2020

In other fields 
 Perfect score on the ACT.
 (Oilfield terminology): A pipe wrench 36 inches long
 +36 is the code for international direct-dialphone calls to Hungary

See also
 List of highways numbered 36

References 

Integers